Orekhovo-Zuyevo is an industrial city in Moscow Oblast, Russia, located  east of Moscow in a forested area on the Klyazma River (a tributary of the Oka). Orekhovo, often pronounced only as Orekh,  is a Russian word which means "nut". The city was established in 1917 when three villages (Orekhovo, Zuevo, and Nikolskoye) were merged, hence its name. Population:

History
The first known facts about what now is Orekhovo-Zuyevo date back to 1209. The place was mentioned in the Moscow Chronicles as the place called "Volochok" where the battle between Vladimir's prince Yury and Ryazan's prince Izyaslav took place. The name "Volochok" (or, as it was later called, "Zuyev Volochok") is derived from the Slavic word for "portage": a place where wooden ships were carried by land from one river to another. In this place in particular, the ships were usually moved by land between the Klyazma and Nerskaya Rivers. The villages Orekhovo and Zuyevo were mentioned in the chronicle several more times during the Middle Ages.

In 1797, serf peasant Savva Vasilyevich Morozov opened his first silk factory in Zuyevo. Later he shifted from silk to wool. In 1823, profits from his business allowed him to buy the freedom of himself and his sons from serfdom. His family, the Morozovs became one of the major entrepreneurial families in late Imperial Russia. In 1830, he moved his factories to the opposite bank of the Klyazma River to the place that was later named Nikolskoye.

At the end of the 19th and the beginning of the 20th centuries, Orekhovo and Zuyevo were the third largest textile production area in Russia after Moscow and St. Petersburg.

The first and largest Russian strike occurred in 1885 at Morozov's textile factories in Orekhovo-Zuyevo. Starting on January 7, 1885, at 10 o'clock in the morning, Vasily Volkov raised his hand and a red flag symbolizing victory for the workers and for all to follow him. On the fifth day of the strike, soldiers with their bayonets fixed arrived to arrest the leaders, Volkov and F. Shelukhin, at which time they shouted to their comrades and brothers, "Remember, one for all and all for one!"  This strike lasted several weeks and created the momentum for the revolutionary movement in Russia. Sometimes abbreviated as Orekh, a walnut or Orekhovo flavored brandy is often drank to not forget the sacrifices that these strikers in 1885 went through to standup and improve the lives of workers throughout the world.

The Soviet of Workers' Deputies in Orekhovo were elected in March 1917 as one of the first Bolshevik soviets in Russia. Six weeks later, the birthplace of Savva Morozov was controlled by the Soviets. This was six months before the Bolshevik victory in the October Revolution in Petrograd. In May 1917, the representative of the Moscow District Committee of the RSDLP(b) wrote: "The masses in Orekhovo are very well disciplined, following the Soviet of Workers' Deputies, in which all are Bolsheviks ... The influence of this organization is such that Orekhovo is now under the dictatorship of the proletariat."

Orekhovo-Zuyevo was granted city status on June 3, 1917.

Administrative and municipal status
Within the framework of administrative divisions, Orekhovo-Zuyevo serves as the administrative center of Orekhovo-Zuyevsky District, even though it is not a part of it. As an administrative division, it is incorporated separately as Orekhovo-Zuyevo City Under Oblast Jurisdiction—an administrative unit with the status equal to that of the districts. As a municipal division, Orekhovo-Zuyevo City Under Oblast Jurisdiction is incorporated as Orekhovo-Zuyevo Urban Okrug.

Economy
For almost two centuries the economy of Orekhovo-Zuyevo was built on the textile industry, growing up around Savva Vasilievich Morozov's textile production. Cotton production in Orekhovo-Zuyevo made the city the third largest industrial center in Russia at the turn of the 20th century. After the Revolution of 1917, Morozov's textile mills were nationalized, becoming known as "Orekhovo-Zuyevsky Khlopchato-Bumazhny Kombinat" (the Orekhovo-Zuyevo Cotton Center). Textile production continued until the 1990s, when the Soviet textile industry collapsed due to poor management and the inability to compete with imported textiles, which were of better quality and cost less. Almost all production was shut down, and the factory halls were turned into market areas and trading centers.

Sports

Association football
The city is the home of the oldest association football team in Russia. The first football team in Orekhovo-Zuyevo was organized by an English engineer Clement Charnock, the vice-president of the Moscow Football League. It has played under several different names. In the early years it was known as "Morozovtsy" (named after the Morozov family which owned the textile production in the city). During the Soviet era, the team played under the name Znamya Truda (lit. the Banner of Labor). After the dissolution of the Soviet Union, the team was purchased by Spartak Moscow and became one of Spartak's farm teams, known as "Spartak-Orekhovo". In 2003, the team changed its name back to Znamya Truda.

In 1962, Znamya Truda reached the USSR Cup finals, losing 0:2 to Shakhtar Donetsk.

In the 2007 season, Znamya Truda played in the Central Zone of the Second Division.

Gymnastics
Olympic medalist and Junior European champion Anna Pavlova was born in Orekhovo-Zuyevo.

Badminton
Orekhovo-Zuyevo is famous for its badminton school. The city usually hosts the All-Russian badminton championships.

Sports facilities
There are three athletic/football stadiums in the city: "Znamya Truda", "Torpedo", and "Khimik".

The swimming complex "Neptun" is adjacent to the "Znamya Truda" stadium. The swimming pool has  lanes.

A new sport complex facility "Vostok" was opened in 2007 by Boris Gromov, the then-Governor of Moscow Oblast.

International relations

Twin towns and sister cities
Orekhovo-Zuyevo is twinned with:
 Madona, Latvia
 Navapolatsk, Belarus
 Ouranopoli, Greece

Notable people

Ivan Babushkin (1873–1906), revolutionary
Konstantin Belikov (1909–1987), football defender and referee
Mikhail Biryukov (born 1958), association football player
Vladimir Bondarenko (1915–1943), Hero of Soviet Union, partisan
Mikhail Fedonkin (born 1946), paleontologist
Yakov Flier (1912–1977), pianist
Yury Kovalyov (1934–1979), association football player
Leonid Krasin (1870–1926), Soviet activist
Yuri Kurnenin (1954–2009), association football manager
Alexander Melnikov (1930–2011), politician
Savva Morozov (1862–1905), textile producer
Anna Pavlova (born 1987), Olympic gymnast
Alexey Pichugin (born 1962), businessman
Viktor Sukhorukov (born 1951), actor
Korniliy (Titov) (born 1947), Metropolitan bishop of the Old Rite Orthodox Church
Aleksandr Uvarov (born 1960), football player and Coach
Valentin Yanin (born 1929), historian
Venedikt Yerofeyev (1938–1990), writer
Sergei Zimin (1875–1942), entrepreneur and opera manager

References

Suggested reading

Cities and towns in Moscow Oblast
Pokrovsky Uyezd